Plainpalais is a neighbourhood in Geneva, Switzerland, and a former municipality of the Canton of Geneva.
It is mentioned in Mary Shelley's Frankenstein.

Argentine author Jorge Luis Borges' ashes are buried in the cemetery of Plainpalais.

Plaine de Plainpalais 
The Plaine de Plainpalais is a large public square (78 135 square metres). It is home of the Plainpalais skatepark. Inaugurated in 2012, the Plainpalais skatepark is intended for young people over the age of 10 who practise skateboarding, roller skating and BMX riding at any level. Covering 3,000 m2, it is one of the biggest skate parks in Europe.

References

See also 

 Geneva massacre of 9 November 1932

Municipalities of the canton of Geneva